Inga Nikolayevna Afonina (born August 26, 1969) is a retired diver from Russia, who is best known for winning the silver medal at the 1991 European Championships in the women's 10 m platform, behind Yelena Miroshina. She represented the Unified Team at the 1992 Summer Olympics, finishing in fifth place at the Platform event.

See also
 List of divers

References
 sports-reference

1969 births
Living people
Soviet female divers
Russian female divers
Divers at the 1992 Summer Olympics
Olympic divers of the Unified Team